Asim Khan may refer to:
 Asim Khan (cricketer) (born 1962), Dutch cricketer
 Asim Khan (squash player) (born 1996), Pakistani squash player
 Asim Ahmed Khan (born 1976), Indian politician